Arkell's Brewery was established in Swindon, England by John Arkell in 1843, and has been owned by members of the Arkell family since its establishment. It is Swindon's oldest company, built initially on the massive expansion of Swindon in the Victorian era with the arrival of the railways and the decision by Isambard Kingdom Brunel to site the Great Western Railway Works in Swindon in 1841.

Brewery
Originally a steam brewery, with the engines now being powered by electricity, Arkell's is a tower brewery which works on the principle that raw materials are fed into the top of the building and beer comes out in casks at the bottom.

The brewery building is a Grade II listed building and the site has been designated an Urban Conservation Area by Swindon Borough Council.

Distribution
The brewery owns 92 pubs in the Swindon area and surrounds, including locations in Oxford, Newbury, Reading, Cheltenham, Gloucester and Ascot; and sells its products to free houses in the Thames Valley and London.

In 2005, the brewery entered into a contract with rail company First Great Western to have its beer stocked in their buffet cars.

Promotion
Arkell's have sponsored events at Newbury Racecourse since 1979.

The brewery has been visited by the Duke of Kent and politicians including Michael Howard and William Hague.

House Beers

Honey Pale Ale
2B
3B
Wiltshire Gold
Kingsdown Ale
Moonlight
Mustang Black
Hoperation IPA
1843 Craft Lager

Most recently, Arkell's Kingsdown ale was named champion beer at the 2016 Taste of the West Product Awards. It's Craft 1843 Lager won SIBA's BeerX celebration of British Beer Gold Award 'Champion' Beer 2014 & SIBA Pale and Golden Lagers Gold Award South Region 2014.

See also 
 Arkell, Ontario, Canada

References

External links
 Official Arkell's Brewery Website
 Gallery of Arkell's images from Swindon Libraries

Buildings and structures in Swindon
Food and drink companies established in 1843
Companies based in Swindon
1843 establishments in England
Tower breweries
Breweries in England
British companies established in 1843